The Best of Black Sabbath is a double CD compilation album by Black Sabbath released in 2000 on the Sanctuary Records label. Its 32 songs are presented chronologically from the band's first 11 albums, spanning the years 1970 to 1983.  Black Sabbath's classic six-album run, from 1970s debut Black Sabbath through 1975's Sabotage is celebrated with three to six songs from each album.  Original vocalist Ozzy Osbourne's subsequent final two albums with the band, 1976's Technical Ecstasy and 1978's Never Say Die!, are represented by one and two songs, respectively.  Replacement Ronnie James Dio's early 80's stint fronting the band on two albums is acknowledged with the title track of 1980's Heaven and Hell and a track from 1981's The Mob Rules. The compilation closes with a song from 1983's attempted rebirth, Born Again, former Deep Purple vocalist Ian Gillan's sole album with the band.  The Best of Black Sabbath does not include any later material with vocalists Glenn Hughes (1986's Seventh Star), Tony Martin (1986–96) or the returning Dio (1992's Dehumanizer).

As this compilation album is released by a record label not associated with Black Sabbath or their management, it is not considered an official Black Sabbath release, and isn't in their official catalogue.  There have been roughly half a dozen compilations released throughout Black Sabbath's career titled The Best of Black Sabbath. None of them are official band releases.

Track listing 
All songs were written by Tony Iommi, Geezer Butler, Ozzy Osbourne, and Bill Ward except where noted.

Tracks 1–5 are from Black Sabbath (1970); 6–11 are from Paranoid (1970); and 12–16 are from Master of Reality (1971)

Tracks 1–3 are from Vol. 4 (1972); track 4–6 are from Sabbath Bloody Sabbath (1973); 7–10 are from Sabotage (1975); 11 is from Technical Ecstasy (1976); 12 & 13 from Never Say Die! (1978); 14 is from Heaven and Hell (1980), 15 from Mob Rules (1981); and 16 from Born Again (1983)

Album cover 
The album cover features in the foreground four water-filled stone-hewn graves, dating back to the 11th century. The location is St Peter's Church, Heysham, Lancashire, North West England, overlooking Morecambe Bay. In the background the sun is setting, so apparently it is at dusk. It has a "The Best of Black Sabbath" title which appears in a Greek style font. On the back of the booklet (which contains extensive liner notes, penned by Hugh Gilmour, and credits) there is a silhouette of Geezer Butler playing in the moonlight.

Personnel 
1969-1979 Disc One tracks 1-16; Disc Two tracks 1-13

The albums that this line-up is featured on are Black Sabbath, Paranoid, Master of Reality, Vol. 4, Sabbath Bloody Sabbath, Sabotage, Technical Ecstasy, and Never Say Die!.

 Ozzy Osbourne - vocals, harmonica (only track 2 on disc I)
 Tony Iommi - guitars, piano, synthesizer
 Geezer Butler - bass
 Bill Ward - drums
 Rodger Bain - producer (Black Sabbath, Paranoid, and Master of Reality)
 Patrick Meehan - producer (Vol. 4)
 Mike Butcher - co-producer (Sabotage, Technical Ecstasy, Never Say Die!)
 Robin Black - co-producer (Sabotage, Technical Ecstasy, Never Say Die!)

1980 Disc Two track 14

The album that this line-up is featured on is Heaven and Hell.

 Ronnie James Dio - vocals
 Tony Iommi - guitars
 Geezer Butler - bass
 Bill Ward - drums

1981-1982 Disc Two track 15

The album that this line-up is featured on is Mob Rules.

 Ronnie James Dio - vocals
 Tony Iommi -  guitars
 Geezer Butler - bass
 Vinny Appice - drums

1983-1984 Disc Two track 16

The album that this line-up is featured on is Born Again.

 Ian Gillan - vocals
 Tony Iommi - guitars
 Geezer Butler - bass
 Bill Ward - drums

Charts

Certifications

References 

Black Sabbath compilation albums
Best of Black Sabbath, The
Sanctuary Records compilation albums